The fourth season of the Case Closed anime was directed by Kenji Kodama and produced by TMS Entertainment and Yomiuri Telecasting Corporation. The series is based on Gosho Aoyama's Case Closed manga series. In Japan, the series is titled  but was changed due to legal issues with the title Detective Conan. The episodes' plot continues Jimmy Kudo's life as a young child named Conan Edogawa.

The episodes use six pieces of theme music: two opening theme and two closing themes in the Japanese episodes and one opening theme and one ending theme in the English adaption. The English opening is Mystery, "Nazo" with English lyrics sung by Stephanie Naldony until episode 102. The second opening is, "Unmei no Roulette Mawashite" by Zard, is used onwards. The first English ending theme is "Summer Without You" with lyrics by Carl Finch until episode eighty-seven. The second English ending is "Negai Goto Hitotsu Dake" by Miho Komatsu onwards.

The season initially ran from December 1, 1997 through June 22, 1998 on Nippon Television Network System in Japan. Episodes eighty-six to one hundred-six were later collected into seven DVD compilations by Shogakukan and were all released on March 24, 2006. The season was later licensed and dubbed by Funimation Entertainment and released in a DVD box set containing episodes eighty to one hundred-five, seventy-seven to ninety-nine in the Japanese numbering. The Viridian edition of the season was released on March 23, 2010.


Episode listing

Notes

 The episode's numbering as followed in Japan
 The episode's numbering as followed by Funimation Entertainment
 The episodes were aired as a single two-hour long episode in Japan
 These episodes are part of the fifth season of Case Closed

References

1997 Japanese television seasons
1998 Japanese television seasons
Season 4